[[File:John Cleveley the Elder, The Royal George at Deptford Showing the Launch of The Cambridge (1757).jpg|thumb|350px|The 'Royal George' at Deptford Showing the Launch of 'The Cambridge (1755) by John Cleveley the Elder]]John Cleveley the Elder''' (c.1712 – 21 May 1777) was an English marine artist.

Life
Cleveley was born in Southwark.  He was not from an artistic background, and his father intended him to follow the family trade of joinery, so he set up as a carpenter or shipwright in around 1742 at the Deptford Dockyard.  Continuing his work in that area throughout his life (indeed, he is referred to as ‘carpenter belonging to His Majesty’s Ship Victory, in the pay of His M[ajest]ys Navy’ in letters of administration granted by the Admiralty in 1778 to his widow, probably when she was first fitting out), from about 1745 he also worked as a painter, mostly ship portraits, dockyard scenes of shipbuilding and launches, and some other marine views.  They combined his knowledge of shipbuilding with accurate architectural and topographical detail.  Apparently mostly self-taught, it is possible that dockyard ship-painters also gave him some training in this area.  He toured East Anglia, and produced some paintings from notes made on that trip.

The theme for a series of six paintings, displayed in the parlour of one of the survivors of the Luxborough Galley, was repeated in  The Loss of the 'Luxborough' Galley in 1727 and the Escape of Some of her Crew'' (Greenwich Hospital coll., National Maritime Museum, London).

Children 
 John Cleveley the Younger (1747–1786) and Robert Cleveley (1747–1809), twins, both artists
James Cleveley, ship's carpenter on  during Cook’s last Pacific voyage, 1776–1780.

References

External links 

 "The Cleveley Family", at Portcities
The Mariners' Museum

1712 births
1777 deaths
18th-century English painters
English male painters
British marine artists
People from Southwark
18th-century English male artists